Graveyard Classics III is the third cover album by Six Feet Under. It was released on January 19, 2010 on Metal Blade Records.

The album was recorded at D.O.I. Digital Audio in Tampa, Florida. Mark Lewis mixed Graveyard Classics III at Audiohammer Studios, and the album was produced by band member Chris Barnes.

This was the last album to feature original members Greg Gall and Terry Butler before their departure in early 2011.

Track listing

Personnel
Six Feet Under
Chris Barnes - vocals
Steve Swanson - guitars
Terry Butler - bass
Greg Gall - drums

Productions
Mark Lewis - Mixing
Chris Barnes - Producer
Chaz Najjar - Engineering
Dusty Peterson - Artwork.

References

External links
Official website
Details on metalunderground
Source of album cover and more details of the album

2010 albums
Six Feet Under (band) albums
Covers albums
Metal Blade Records albums